Mapena is a language of Papua New Guinea.

References

Languages of Milne Bay Province
Dagan languages